The Detroit Tigers are a Major League Baseball (MLB) franchise based in Detroit, Michigan. They play in the American League Central division. The first game of the new baseball season is played on Opening Day, and being named the starter that day is an honor, which is often given to the player who is expected to lead the pitching staff that season, though there are various strategic reasons why a team's best pitcher might not start on Opening Day. Since joining the league in 1901, the Tigers have used 57 different Opening Day starting pitchers. The Tigers have a record of 56 wins and 61 losses in their Opening Day games.  They also played one tie game, in 1927.

The Tigers have played in three different home ball parks, Bennett Park from 1901 through 1911, Tiger Stadium (also known as Navin Field and Briggs Stadium) from 1912 to 1999 and Comerica Park since 2000. They had a record of five wins and two losses in Opening Day games at Bennett Park, 19 wins and 22 losses at Tiger Stadium and three wins and four losses at Comerica Park, for a total home record in Opening Day games of 26 wins and 28 losses.  Their record in Opening Day away games is 27 wins, 31 losses and one tie.

Jack Morris has the most Opening Day starts for the Tigers, with 11 consecutive starts from 1980 to 1990. Morris had a record of seven wins and four losses in his Opening Day starts. George Mullin had ten Opening Day starts for the Tigers between 1903 and 1913. The Tigers won five of those games and lost the other five. Mickey Lolich had seven Opening Day starts between 1965 and 1974. He had a record of five wins and two losses in those starts.  Justin Verlander has also made seven Opening Day starts for the Tigers, between 2008 and 2014.  His record in those starts is one win and one loss with five no-decisions.  Other Tiger pitchers with at least three Opening Day starts include Hal Newhouser with six, Earl Whitehill and Jim Bunning with four; and Tommy Bridges, Frank Lary and Mike Moore with three.

The first game the Tigers played as a Major League team was on April 25, 1901, against the Milwaukee Brewers.  Roscoe Miller was the Tigers Opening Day starting pitcher for that game, which the Tigers won 14–13.  The Tigers have played in the World Series eleven times, in 1907, 1908, 1909, 1934, 1935, 1940, 1945, 1968, 1984, 2006, and 2012, with wins in four of those: 1935, 1945, 1968 and 1984.  The Tigers Opening Day starting pitchers in those seasons were Mullin (1907 and 1909), Ed Siever (1908), Firpo Marberry (1934), Rowe (1935), Newsom (1940), Newhouser (1945), Earl Wilson (1968), Morris (1984), Kenny Rogers (2006), and Justin Verlander (2012).  The Tigers won five of those Opening Day games and lost the other five.

Josh Billings was the Tigers Opening Day starting pitcher in 1928, despite being only 20 years old and having only won five Major League games prior to the season.  Bunning, who made four Opening Day starts for the Tigers was later elected to the United States Senate.  McLain, who made two Opening Day starts for the Tigers, was later convicted of embezzlement.  Bunning and Newhouser have each been inducted into the Baseball Hall of Fame.

Key

Pitchers

References
General

Specific

Opening day starters
Lists of Major League Baseball Opening Day starting pitchers